Surjaman Thapa is a Bhutanese politician who has been a member of the National Council of Bhutan, since May 2018.

Education
He holds a Bachelor of Arts in Journalism and Mass Communication degree from St Joseph's College, Darjeeling.

References 

Members of the National Council (Bhutan)
Living people
Year of birth missing (living people)
Bhutanese people of Nepalese descent